Kurtus gulliveri, the nurseryfish, is a species of fish in the family Kurtidae native to fresh and brackish waters in southern New Guinea and northern Australia. They can be found in estuaries, mangrove swamps, nipa swamps and slow-flowing rivers with high turbidity. This species is famous for its unusual breeding strategy where the male carries the egg cluster on a hook protruding from the forehead (supraoccipital). Females do not have a hook. It feeds on crustaceans (especially prawn and shrimp), small fish and insect larvae. This species is well regarded as food. The specific name honours a "Mr Gulliver" who collected the type, thought most likely to refer to Thomas Allen Gulliver (1847-1931) who worked on Australia's a post and telegraph services and who lived near the Norman River, Gulf of Carpentaria where he collected natural history specimens and where the type of this species was collected.

References

Kurtidae
Fish described in 1878